Century Park may refer to:
Century Park, Edmonton, a transit-oriented development under construction in Alberta, Canada
Century Park station (Edmonton), a light rail station associated with Century Park, Edmonton, Alberta, Canada
Century Park (Haikou), Hainan, China
Century Park (Shanghai), the biggest park in Shanghai, China
Century Park station (Shanghai Metro), a metro station associated with Century Park, Shanghai, China